Hurd v. Hodge, 334 U.S. 24 (1948), was a companion case to Shelley v. Kraemer,  in which the Court held that the Fourteenth Amendment prohibits a federal court from enforcing restrictive covenants that would prohibit a person from owning or occupying property based on race or color. Hurd v. Hodge also involved racially restrictive covenants on houses in the Bloomingdale neighborhood of Washington, D.C.

However, the Equal Protection Clause does not explicitly apply to a U.S. territory not in a U.S. state, and so the decision varied from the Fourteenth Amendment ruling in Shelley v. Kraemer. In Hurd, the Court found against the segregationists by holding that both the Civil Rights Act of 1866 and treating persons in the District of Columbia like those in the states would forbid restrictive covenants.

See also
List of United States Supreme Court cases, volume 334
Shelley v. Kraemer (1948), a companion case to Hurd v. Hodge

References

External links
 
 

United States equal protection case law
United States Supreme Court cases
United States Supreme Court cases of the Vinson Court
United States land use case law
20th-century American trials
1948 in United States case law
Housing rights activism
African-American history between emancipation and the civil rights movement
Civil rights movement case law
1948 in Washington, D.C.
Housing in Washington, D.C.
United States racial discrimination case law
May 1948 events in the United States